"The Red" is a single from the band Chevelle. It is the fifth track and lead single from their major label debut, Wonder What's Next, released in 2002. Former Major League Baseball player Geoff Blum used "The Red" as his intro song when he came up to bat.

The song is about dealing with frustration and anger. Its music video depicts an anger management seminar where vocalist Pete Loeffler ascends a podium and sings the verse lyrics. The video then breaks to Chevelle performing the heavy chorus under red lighting. The agitated seminar participants, which include band members Sam and Joe, begin tossing folding chairs. By the end of the song, it is revealed that the fight happened to be just a daydream.

Critical reception
Loudwire ranked it the greatest Chevelle song.

Track listing

In other media
This song played during the nominee montage for Best Movie for The Ring at the 2003 MTV Movie Awards. In 2021, the song was used at the 2021 WWE Hall of Fame ceremony for a video package commemorating the career of the class headliner Kane.

Charts

Certification

References

External links
 YouTube video
 The Red song facts
 [ Chevelle - Artist Chart History]

2002 singles
Chevelle (band) songs
Songs written by Pete Loeffler
Songs written by Sam Loeffler
Song recordings produced by Garth Richardson
2002 songs
Epic Records singles